Joseph Patrick Dumit (born September 3, 1966) is an American cultural anthropologist and science and technology studies scholar. He is a professor of anthropology and science & technology studies at the University of California, Davis, where he was formerly the director of the Institute for Social Sciences and Science and Technology Studies. He received his BA from Rice University and his Ph.D from the University of California, Santa Cruz. His 2004 book, Picturing Personhood: Brain Scans and Biomedical Identity, received the Diana Forsythe Prize from the American Anthropological Association in 2005 and the Rachel Carson Prize from the Society for Social Studies of Science in 2006.

References

External links

Faculty profile at the Science and Technology Studies program at the University of California, Davis
Faculty profile at the Anthropology Department at the University of California, Davis

Living people
1966 births
Cultural anthropologists
Science and technology studies scholars
University of California, Davis faculty
Rice University alumni
University of California, Santa Cruz alumni
21st-century American anthropologists